France–South Africa relations are the diplomatic relations between France and South Africa. Between 1961 and 1974, France was South Africa's largest supplier of weaponry. France cut off diplomatic relations with South Africa in 1981 and restored relations in 1992. Both nations are members of the G-20 major economies and the United Nations. The two states have strong economic ties; France was South Africa's 9th largest importer as of 2015.

Resident diplomatic missions 
 France has an embassy in Pretoria and consulates-general in Cape Town and Johannesburg.
 South Africa has an embassy in Paris.

See also 
 Foreign relations of France
 Foreign relations of South Africa

References 

 
South Africa
Bilateral relations of South Africa